Li Lixin (born 15 February 1989) is a Chinese professional racing cyclist. She rides for China Chongming-Liv-Champion System Pro Cycling.

See also
 List of 2015 UCI Women's Teams and riders

References

External links

1989 births
Living people
Chinese female cyclists
Place of birth missing (living people)
21st-century Chinese women